Professor Bazlul Mobin Chowdhury (16 March 1941 – 29 December 2010) was the Vice-Chancellor of the Independent University, Bangladesh.

Professor Chowdhury was educated at the University of Dhaka (BA, MA) and at the University of East Anglia and the University of Aberdeen (PhD). He held academic posts at the University of Rajshahi and Shahjalal University of Science and Technology, before moving to IUB in 1994.

References

1941 births
University of Dhaka alumni
Alumni of the University of Aberdeen
2010 deaths